Canadian National 6060 is a 4-8-2 “Mountain”-type steam locomotive built in 1944 by the Montreal Locomotive Works as the first of the U-1-f class for the Canadian National Railway (CN).

History

6060 was constructed in October 1944 by the Montreal Locomotive Works in Montreal, Quebec, as the prototype locomotive of the Canadian National Railway's (CN) U-1-f class 4-8-2 "Mountain types". It was initially assigned to pull main-line passenger trains until 1959, when it was retired and sat in storage on a siding outside in Winnipeg, Manitoba, awaiting to be sent to the scrap yard, but was eventually rescued for preservation by CN engineer Harry R.J. Home, and was put on static display at the Jasper station in Jasper, Alberta, during 1962. Ten years later, CN reacquired 6060, and they restored it to operating condition for excursion service in 1971, as a replacement for U-2-g Confederation 6218, and after being restored by CN in 1973, hauled excursions for their steam excursion program until 1980, when CN ended the program.

That same year, to commemorate the Province of Alberta's 75th anniversary, 6060 was presented to the people of Alberta as a gift. After more than five years of retirement, it was restored a second time with the help of Harry Home, the Province of Alberta and volunteers from the Rocky Mountain Rail Society. 6060 travelled under her own power to Vancouver, British Columbia, in 1986 to participate in the Steam Expo, part of the Expo 86 world's fair, alongside several other steam locomotives, including Canadian Pacific Railway (CPR) 4-6-4 2860, CPR 4-6-2 1201, CN 4-6-0 1392, and Union Pacific (UP) 0-6-0 4466. After Expo 86 ended, the 6060 and 2860 doubleheaded back to Alberta, though when they got there, 6060 developed a mechanical failure, forcing it to be taken off the excursion, while 2860 returned to Vancouver.

After several years of storage at the Alberta Railway Museum near Edmonton, 6060 was moved to Stettler in 1998 to operate regularly in the service of Alberta Prairie Steam Tours (APST). More than a decade later, it continued to transport thousands of excursion passengers every summer until it went out of service in 2010.

See also 

 Canadian National 6077 (Another preserved CN U-1-f class locomotive)
 Canadian National 6213
 Canadian National 6218
 Canadian National 3254
 Grand Trunk Western 6039
 Canadian Pacific 2816

References

Further reading

External links

Rocky Mountain Rail Society - official website of Canadian National 6060

6060
4-8-2 locomotives
MLW locomotives
Preserved steam locomotives of Canada
Railway locomotives introduced in 1944
Standard gauge locomotives of Canada